The 1978 Colgate-Hong Kong Patrons Classic, also known as the Hong Kong Open, was a men's tennis tournament played on outdoor hard courts in Hong Kong that was part of the 1978 Grand Prix tennis circuit. It was the sixth edition of the event and was held from 7 November through 12 November 1978. Eighth-seeded Eliot Teltscher won the singles title.

Finals

Singles
 Eliot Teltscher defeated  Pat DuPré 6–4, 6–3, 6–2
 It was Teltscher's first singles title of his career.

Doubles
 Mark Edmondson /  John Marks defeated  Hank Pfister /  Brad Rowe 5–7, 7–6, 6–1

References

External links
 ITF tournament edition details

Viceroy Classic
1978 in Hong Kong
Tennis in Hong Kong